= Tar Khanan Na Mohra =

- Town
- Location within Pakistan
- Coordinates: 33.27°N 73.17°E
- Country: Pakistan
- Province: (Islamabad Capital Territory) Islamabad C.T
- Elevation: 566 m (1,857 ft)
- Time zone: UTC+5 (PST)

Tar Khanan Na Mohra is a town in the Islamabad Capital Territory of Pakistan. It is located at 73° 17' 5E 566 with an altitude of 566 metres (1860 feet).
